Mutlu Onaral is an American Soul singer from Philadelphia. Born May 16, 1979. A first generation American of Turkish ancestry, Onaral released a five-song EP in 2004, and has served as the guitarist for Amos Lee at live shows, also providing vocal work. He released his debut album, Livin' It, on Manhattan Records in 2008, with the Philadelphia Daily News giving it an A−. The album was produced by Tom Wolk, who also provided backing vocals on two of the songs.

References

External links
Mutlu's Official Website primary source for this entry

Living people
Year of birth missing (living people)
Guitarists from Philadelphia